Kendrick Trepell Vincent (born April 13, 1978) is a former American football guard. He was originally signed by the Pittsburgh Steelers as an undrafted free agent in 2001. He played college football at Mississippi. He last played for the Tampa Bay Buccaneers.

Vincent has also played for the Carolina Panthers, Arizona Cardinals, Baltimore Ravens, and Pittsburgh Steelers in his career. Vincent was a starting guard for the Steelers in 2003 and 2004 and also for the Panthers in 2008 and 2009.

Vincent began the 2010 season as the starting left guard but was waived by the Buccaneers, who had signed him as a free agent in July 2010, in mid-season.

College career
Vincent attended the University of Mississippi and started most of the games for four years.

References

External links
Carolina Panthers bio

1978 births
Living people
Sportspeople from Bartow, Florida
Sportspeople from Lakeland, Florida
American football offensive guards
Ole Miss Rebels football players
Pittsburgh Steelers players
Baltimore Ravens players
Arizona Cardinals players
Carolina Panthers players
Tampa Bay Buccaneers players